Bothropolys is a genus of centipedes in the family Lithobiidae.

References 

Centipede genera
Lithobiomorpha